Parvesh Sahib Singh Verma (born 7 November 1977) is an Indian politician and a Member of parliament (MP) from West Delhi Lok Sabha constituency. As a member of the Bharatiya Janata Party (BJP), he is serving his second term as an MP for West Delhi. In 2014 he was elected to the 16th Lok Sabha, and re-elected in 2019 for the 17th Lok Sabha with the highest ever margin of victory in the history of Delhi, a margin of 578,486 votes.

He is a member of two high level committees of Parliament, the Finance Committee, and the Estimates Committee. He had also served on the Joint Committee on Salaries and Allowances of Members of Parliament and a member of the Standing Committee on Urban Development in his first term as an MP. He contested the Mehrauli Vidhan Sabha constituency in the 2013 assembly election and defeated MP Yoganand Shastri, speaker of the Delhi Vidhan Sabha. Parvesh Verma is the son of Sahib Singh Verma, former Chief Minister of Delhi.

Early life
Parvesh Verma was born to Sahib Singh Verma, a former Chief Minister of Delhi, and Sahib Kaur on 7 November 1977 in a Hindu Jat family. Verma has one brother and three sisters.

Verma studied at Delhi Public School, R. K. Puram and Kirori Mal College. He received his Master of Business Administration from the Fore School of Management. His uncle Azad Singh was the mayor of North Delhi Municipal Corporation and contested Mundka Vidhan Sabha Constituency on the BJP ticket in the 2013 assembly election.

Political career
Verma is a member of the Bharatiya Janata Party (BJP), the ruling party at the Centre and the major opposition party at the Delhi Vidhan Sabha. He was a member of the Delhi BJP Election Committee for the 2013 assembly election. In May 2014, he won West Delhi Constituency and became a Member of Parliament (MP). He became a member of the Joint Committee on Salaries and Allowances of Members of Parliament, and of the Standing Committee on Urban Development. He also served on the governing body of the All India Institute of Medical Sciences (AIIMS) New Delhi. Currently, he is a member of the Estimates Committee, and Finance Committee of the Parliament.

Verma was interested in contesting for the West Delhi Lok Sabha Constituency in the 2009 general election but was denied a ticket by the party, despite receiving assurances from party leaders that he would be considered. Instead Jagdish Mukhi of Janakpuri MLA contested West Delhi. A mahapanchayat held on 22 March 2009 in Dwarka "[condemned] the decision of the BJP to deny Parvesh the ticket".

On 7 November 2013, the BJP announced Verma as the party's candidate from Mehrauli constituency for the 2013 Legislative Assembly election. The mayor of the South Delhi Municipal Corporation, Sarita Chaudhary, and senior BJP Leader Sher Singh Dagar, the BJP candidate for Mehrauli in the 2008 election, both wanted to contest the same seat. Supporters of both the aspirants opposed Verma's candidature. Chaudhary's supporters protested outside the Delhi BJP headquarters and called Verma an "outsider". His mother and wife campaigned for him in the constituency. He defeated runner-up Narinder Singh Sejwal of the Aam Aadmi Party (AAP) by 4,564 votes, and the incumbent MLA and Speaker of the Delhi Vidhan Sabha, Yoganand Shastri. In 2014 Indian general election, Verma won the election for the West Delhi Lok Sabha Constituency by a record margin of 2,68,586 votes.

Verma won a second term as MP in West Delhi with a record-breaking margin of 5.78 lakh votes beating Congress's Mahabal Mishra who got 2,87,162 votes.

Verma broke his own record for the highest victory margin in Delhi and 6th highest in India.

In the 2019 General Elections Verma got 8,65,648 of the total 14,41,601 votes polled in the seat. This is the highest recorded margin in the history of Delhi that any Lok Sabha candidate had ever won by.

Personal life
Verma is married to Swati Singh, the daughter of former Union Minister and BJP leader from Madhya Pradesh, Vikram Verma. They have 3 children, two daughters and a son. Eldest among them is Sanidhi Singh, followed by Prisha Singh and Shiven Singh. He runs the NGO Rashtriya Swabhiman.

Controversies
During the 2020 Delhi Legislative Assembly election campaigning, Verma openly threatened Shaheen Bagh protesters saying that if the BJP is voted to power in Delhi, it will clear off protests in Shaheen Bagh within one hour; and further courted controversy while addressing a rally, by claiming that people from the Shaheen Bagh protests would "enter your houses, rape your sisters and daughters".

Before the first phase of 2022 Uttar Pradesh Legislative Assembly election, Verma made a controversial offer of post-poll alliance with BJP to Rashtriya Lok Dal's Jayant Chaudhary after hosting a meeting of Home Minister Amit Shah with Jat leaders from Western UP; and Verma also told the mediapersons that Jayant, who was in alliance with the Samajwadi Party, had "chosen a wrong home".

Verma has also come under fire for making hate speech calling for the 'total boycott' of Muslims at a recent rally organised by the VHP.

See also
Manoj Tiwari
Gautam Gambhir

References

1977 births
Living people
Bharatiya Janata Party politicians from Delhi
People from West Delhi district
Kirori Mal College alumni
Members of the Delhi Legislative Assembly
Delhi Public School alumni
India MPs 2014–2019
Lok Sabha members from Delhi
Delhi MLAs 2013–2015
People from South Delhi district
Far-right politicians in India
India MPs 2019–present
Delhi University alumni